The Municipal Park Monday and its main attraction – approximately  tall and  wide waterfall named Saltos del Monday – are located in the Presidente Franco District, Alto Paraná Department, Paraguay, located around 25°33'40.6"S latitude and 54°38'00.1"W longitude, occupying an area of .

Weather
The average annual temperature is 21 °C, the highest reaches 38 °C and the minimum 0 °C. The highest annual amount of the country in rainfall occurs in the region of Alto Paraná.

Animals and Plants
The Municipal Park Monday includes a natural reserve of nine hectares covered by a thick vegetation, rich with diverse species of flora and fauna and is one of the last remaining blocks of the Alto Paraná Atlantic forests west from the Paraná River.

Hydrography
 
The Monday River empties into the Paraná River, has a variable flow depending on the seasons of rain.

Tourism

In Presidente Franco District, nature gives the region a show over the waters, the imposing Monday Falls, form a remarkable natural spectacle that has a long history, it was one of the stations in the path of the pre-Hispanic Guarani.

The waterfall is more than 40 meters high and consists of three main falls with other minors who rushed up near the mouth of the River Monday, one of the major tributaries of the right bank of the Parana River.

References

 ABC Color
 ABC Ciudadano

External links
 Itaipu-Turismo
 Marandú

Waterfalls of Paraguay
Parks in Paraguay
Tourism in Paraguay
Alto Paraná Department